Ruth Kinuthia is a make-up artist and former beauty pageant title-holder from Kenya.

Biography 
Kinuthia won the Miss Kenya title in 2008, at the age of 26, and represented her country in Miss World 2008 in South Africa. She studied international business administration and has a degree in law.

Kinuthia later founded her own make-up business, and In 2016 she won Makeup Artist of the Year at the Kenya Fashion Awards.

References

1980s births
Living people
Miss World 2008 delegates
Kenyan beauty pageant winners
Make-up artists